Länsisaaret is a southeastern neighborhood of Helsinki, Finland.

External links 
 

Neighbourhoods of Helsinki
Ullanlinna district